Neginhal  is a village in the state of Karnataka, India. It is located in the Bailhongal taluk of Belgaum district in Karnataka.

Demographics
 India census, Neginhal had a population of 6,813 with 3,435 males and 3,378 females.

See also
 Belgaum
 Districts of Karnataka

References

External links
 http://Belgaum.nic.in/

Villages in Belagavi district